Politika a.d. (full legal name: Politika a.d. Beograd) (BELEX: PLTK) is a Serbian media corporation founded in present form in 2005, and it has continually existed in various legal forms since 1904.

It is partly owned by Government of Serbia and companies in which the Republic of Serbia has majority of shares with the other part belonging to small shareholders.

Management
The company is run by a 10-member Managing Board and 4-member Executive Board. The Managing Board is composed of the following individuals:
 Darko Ribnikar
 Zeferino Grasi
 Srećko Bugarinović
 Danilo Jakić
 Zoran Mašorinski
 Jasmina Mitrović-Marić
 Slobodan Bogunović
 Kosta Sandić
 Nemanja Stevanović
 Suzana Vasiljević

The board is structured such that one member is the government's representative, one member represents small shareholders, a number may be proposed by the government, and all board members need to be confirmed by a shareholder's meeting.

Assets

Politika Newspapers & Magazines
Since 2002, together with German madia concern WAZ, Politika AD maintains a 50-50 joint venture called Politika Newspapers & Magazines that's registered as a limited liability company. That joint entity controls two daily newspapers (Politika, Sportski žurnal), and eight periodical publications (Ilustrovana politika, Svet kompjutera, Ana, Viva (discontinued), Bazar, Enigmatika, Huper (discontinued mid-December 2008), Politikin zabavnik, and Razbibriga). The same joint venture also owns a large printing facility using Komori technology controlled through a company called Politika stamparija d.o.o. as well as a large distribution network.

RTV Politika
Politika AD also owned controlling stake (50.97%) in RTV Politika, local radio-television broadcaster seen and heard throughout city of Belgrade and surrounding municipalities that eventually stopped broadcasting in 2007.

References

External links
 
 Credit Risk Monitor report
 Google Finance report

1904 establishments in Serbia
Companies based in Belgrade
Magazine publishing companies
Mass media companies established in 1904
Publishing companies of Serbia
Newspaper companies